Charbelicaris is a prehistoric genus of crustacean that lived during the Upper Cretaceous in what is now Lebanon. It is named for Charbel Makhlouf, a Lebanese Maronite saint.

References

Achelata
Crustaceans described in 2016
Fossil taxa described in 2016
Late Cretaceous crustaceans
Late Cretaceous arthropods of Asia
Fossils of Lebanon
Cretaceous Lebanon